William Henry Bland (12 January 1898 – after 1934) was an English professional footballer who made 130 appearances in the Football League playing for Plymouth Argyle and Cardiff City. He played as a defender.

Bland was born in Leeds. He served in the Royal Navy and signed for Plymouth Argyle after being posted to the city. He made his debut in the Football League a month short of his 30th birthday and replaced the ageing Moses Russell at right back. He made 128 appearances for the club in all competitions, the last of which came in March 1934. The following season played a few games for Cardiff City, however the side suffered several heavy defeats in a disappointing season ,and Bland was one of numerous players released in a bid to improve the club's fortunes.

References

1898 births
Year of death missing
Place of death missing
Footballers from Leeds
English footballers
Association football fullbacks
Plymouth Argyle F.C. players
Cardiff City F.C. players
English Football League players
Royal Navy sailors
20th-century Royal Navy personnel